Gu Jinchi (February 1932 – 17 March 2009) was a Chinese Communist politician who served as party secretary of Gansu from 1990 to 1993 and party secretary of Liaoning.

He was a member of the 13th and 14th Central Committee of the Chinese Communist Party. He was a representative of the 15th National Congress of the Chinese Communist Party. He was a delegate to the 8th National People's Congress and a member of the Standing Committee of the 9th National People's Congress.

Biography
Gu was born in Xiong County, Hebei, in February 1932. He worked at Beijing Machinery Factory in 1947. He joined the Chinese Communist Party (CCP) in October 1949. 

In 1952, he was assigned to the Beijing No. 1 Machine Tool Factory, he remained at the factory until 1965, when he was transferred to southwest China's Sichuan province and appointed party secretary of the newly founded Changzheng Machine Tool Plant. In 1966, the Cultural Revolution broke out, he was sent to the May Seventh Cadre Schools to do farm works. He was removed from office but reinstated two years later. Gu got involved in politics in 1978, when he was appointed vice mayor and party secretary of Zigong. At the same time, he was admitted to member of the Standing Committee of the CCP Zigong Municipal Committee, the city's top authority. In 1982, he was promoted to become vice governor of Sichuan and was admitted to member of the Standing Committee of the CCP Sichuan Provincial Committee, the province's top authority. He was chosen as deputy party secretary of Sichuan in 1987.

In October 1990, he was promoted again to become party secretary of Gansu, succeeding Li Ziqi. 

In September 1993, he was despatched to northeast China's Liaoning province and appointed party secretary, the top political position in the province. 

In March 1998, he took office as vice chairperson of the National People's Congress Supervisory and Judicial Affairs Committee.

On 17 March 2009, he died from an illness in Beijing, at the age of 77.

References

1932 births
2009 deaths
People from Xiong County
People's Republic of China politicians from Hebei
Chinese Communist Party politicians from Hebei
Members of the 13th Central Committee of the Chinese Communist Party
Members of the 14th Central Committee of the Chinese Communist Party
Delegates to the 8th National People's Congress
Members of the Standing Committee of the 9th National People's Congress